The 2004 DHL 400 was the 15th stock car race of the 2004 NASCAR Nextel Cup Series season and the 36th iteration of the event. The race was held on Sunday, June 20, 2004, before a crowd of 160,000 in Brooklyn, Michigan, at Michigan International Speedway, a two-mile (3.2 km) moderate-banked D-shaped speedway. The race took the scheduled 200 laps to complete. At race's end, the race would end under caution after P. J. Jones crashed in Turn 2 in the last lap, leaving Ryan Newman of Penske-Jasper Racing winning his 10th career NASCAR Nextel Cup Series win and his first of the season. To fill out the podium, Kasey Kahne of Evernham Motorsports and Dale Jarrett of Robert Yates Racing would finish second and third, respectively.

Background 
The race was held at Michigan International Speedway, a two-mile (3.2 km) moderate-banked D-shaped speedway located in Brooklyn, Michigan. The track is used primarily for NASCAR events. It is known as a "sister track" to Texas World Speedway as MIS's oval design was a direct basis of TWS, with moderate modifications to the banking in the corners, and was used as the basis of Auto Club Speedway. The track is owned by International Speedway Corporation. Michigan International Speedway is recognized as one of motorsports' premier facilities because of its wide racing surface and high banking (by open-wheel standards; the 18-degree banking is modest by stock car standards).

Entry list

Practice

First practice 
The first practice session would occur on Friday, June 18, at 11:20 AM EST, and would last for two hours.

Second practice 
The second practice session would occur on Saturday, June 19, at 9:30 AM EST, and would last for 45 minutes.

Third and final practice 
The third and final practice session, sometimes referred to as Happy Hour, occurred on Saturday, June 19, at 11:10 AM EST, and would last for 45 minutes.

Qualifying 
Qualifying was held on Friday, June 18, at 3:05 PM EST. Each driver would have two laps to set a fastest time; the fastest of the two would count as their official qualifying lap. Positions 1-38 would be decided on time, while positions 39-43 would be based on provisionals. Four spots are awarded by the use of provisionals based on owner's points. The fifth is awarded to a past champion who has not otherwise qualified for the race. If no past champ needs the provisional, the next team in the owner points will be awarded a provisional.

Dave Blaney of Richard Childress Racing would crash on his first lap, forcing him to use a provisional.

Two drivers would fail to qualify: Kerry Earnhardt and Carl Long.

Full qualifying results

Race results

References 

2004 NASCAR Nextel Cup Series
NASCAR races at Michigan International Speedway
June 2004 sports events in the United States
2004 in sports in Michigan